Ulat Bayan is the flagship national primetime newscast of PTV, Originally anchored by Aljo Bendijo and Catherine Vital, it premiered on July 10, 2017, replacing PTV News and was replaced by the weekday edition of PTV News later will be back on September 7, 2020, replacing the weekday edition of PTV News. The newscast airs from Monday to Sunday from 6:00 PM to 7:00 PM and is streamed live on the network's Facebook and YouTube pages. It is also heard on Radyo Pilipinas 738.  The weekday newscasts is now anchored by Audrey Gorriceta, Diane Querrer and Maan Macapagal currently serve as the anchors. The weekend editions, meanwhile, are anchored by Joee Guilas and Chi Atienza-Valdepeñas every Saturday, and it is anchored by various PTV correspondents every Sunday.

History
Ulat Bayan started airing as a daily primetime newscast on July 10, 2017, replacing PTV News Primetime Edition, as part of programming changes brought about by the relaunch of PTV on June 28, 2017. PTV News holdover Aljo Bendijo and Catherine Vital (from the late-night edition) first served as anchors. Roughly after two months, the weekday edition was axed and reverted to PTV News, with anchoring changes also made in the chair. Tulfo and Querrer began anchoring the relaunched PTV News, while Ulat Bayan became a weekend newscast which aired on Saturdays and Sundays from 6:00 to 7:00 PM PST and with the Sunday edition being replayed every Monday from 6:00 to 7:00 AM PST. It was also simulcasted on government radio network Radyo Pilipinas.

Before its 2020 relaunch, the program was anchored by a rotation of weekend anchors which included Ignacio, Guilas, Ralph Obina (now with DZBB), Joseph Parafina, Juliet Caranguian, and a rotation of PTV News' Senior Correspondents.

It was slated to air again on weekday evenings beginning August 12, 2020, but was put on hold after COVID-19 infections in the People's Television Network, as well as disinfection procedures. This delayed the relaunch to almost a month, with the new Ulat Bayan plugs teasing Tulfo's return airing before September 7.

On its debut episode, Ulat Bayan, alongside new morning show Rise and Shine Pilipinas, afternoon newscast Sentro Balita, PTV Balita Ngayon and late-night news program PTV News Tonight, transferred to a revamped Studio B, while updating it's graphics, theme music, and title card, leaving PTV Studio A for use of the network's other programs including its public service program, Public Briefing: #LagingHandaPH and Digong 8888 Hotline. In addition, it adopted a new presenter format of four main presenters (as opposed to one or two to three presenters on other networks' news broadcasts), mirroring competitor TV Patrol on ABS-CBN's Kapamilya Channel which adopted the four-presenter format in its broadcasts from 1987 to 1996 and again in 2023.

On April 5, 2021, Aljo Bendijo left the show. leaving Tulfo and Querrer as the main anchor

From May 21, 2021, Tulfo was on self-quarantine, Given this Gani Oro serves as the Weeknight Co-Anchor along with Querrer & Santos, due to the reimposed enhanced community quarantine caused by the surge of COVID-19 cases in the Greater Manila Area as well as a full bed capacity in different Hospitals that started in March 2021. Erwin Tulfo returned anchor to the Studio on July 19, 2021. Aljo Bendijo also returned to Ulat Bayan beginning October 29, 2021.

Santos Bendijo and Tulfo's departure
In December 2021, Alex Santos left the newscast as he moves to Net 25 as host for Responde, and anchor for Mata ng Agila. He was replaced by Audrey Gorriceta. as he rejoined Querrer. In the same month, Later, Aljo Bendijo moved to where he as host for Public Briefing: #LagingHandaPH and anchor for Sentro Balita Erwin Tulfo bid farewell to the newscast to concentrate on campaigning for ACT-CIS Partylist where he is the chairman and his brother Raffy who ran for senator at the 2022 elections. Maan Macapagal and Gani Oro served as Tulfo's replacement since March 2022.

Anchors

Weekday anchors
Audrey Gorriceta (2022–present)
Diane Querrer (2020–present)
Maan Macapagal (2022–present)

Weekend anchors
Joee Guilas (Saturday anchor, 2020–present)
Chi Atienza-Valdepeñas (Saturday anchor, 2022–present)
Allan Francisco (Sunday anchor, 2020–present)
Daniel Manalastas (Sunday anchor, 2020–present)
Kenneth Paciente (Sunday anchor, 2020–present)
Mela Lesmoras (Sunday anchor, 2020–present)

Former anchors
Catherine Vital (2017)
Aljo Bendijo (2017, 2020-2022, moved to Sentro Balita)
Alex Santos (2020–2021 moved to Net 25)
Erwin Tulfo (2020–2021 now DSWD Secretary)
Rocky Ignacio (Saturday anchor, 2017–2022)
Ralph Obina (Saturday anchor, 2017–2019)
Joseph Parafina (Sunday anchor, 2017–2019)
Marita Moaje (Sunday anchor, 2017–2019)
Eunice Samonte (Sunday anchor, 2017-2022 now PPA Spokesperson)
Caesar Soriano (Saturday and Sunday anchor, 2019–2020)
Sweeden Velado-Ramirez (Sunday anchor, 2018, 2020–2022)
Gani Oro (2022)

Former segment anchors
Ice Martinez-Pajarillo (PTV InfoWeather Weekend)
Trixie Jaafar-Tiu (PTV InfoWeather Weekend)
Arrian Jeff Ignacio (Traffic Watch)
Greco Belgica (Pahirap Ang Korap: PACC in Action: 2021)

Segments
Current
Weeknights
PTV Exclusive (since 2020)
Ulat Serye (since 2020)
Police Report (since 2017)
Metro Express (since 2020)
Salot na Droga (since 2020)
PTV InfoWeather (since 2017)
Pasada Probinsya (since 2020)
Ulat Abroad (since 2017)
Balitang ASEAN (since 2017)
PTV Sports (since 2017)
Ulat Showbiz (since 2022)
Patok sa Bayan (formerly Good News 2020-2022) (since 2020)
Trip Ko 'To (since 2022)
Weekends
Batas at Katarungan (since 2020)
Ulat Negosyo (since 2017)
Salot na Droga (since 2018)
PTV InfoWeather (since 2017)
Ulat Abroad (since 2017)
CSC in Action - hosted by Karlo Nograles. (since 2023)
Pasada Probinsya (since 2020)
Balitang ASEAN (since 2017)
PTV Sports (since 2017)
Patok sa Bayan (formerly Good News 2020-2022) (since 2020)
Former
Weeknights
Government at Work (2020–2022)
Trending Balita (2020–2021)
Weekends
Serbisyo OFW (2020–2021)

See also
 List of programs broadcast by People's Television Network
 Rise and Shine Pilipinas
 Sentro Balita
 PTV News Tonight

References

Philippine television news shows
People's Television Network original programming
Filipino-language television shows
2017 Philippine television series debuts
2020s Philippine television series